"Midnight Lady" is a song by English soft rock musician Chris Norman, released as a single in 1986. The song, produced and written by Dieter Bohlen, one half of Modern Talking, reached number one on the German singles chart in May 1986. Norman is popular in Germany where he scored his most hit records during the 1980s. "Midnight Lady" was also successful in Switzerland and Austria, where it also reached the number one spot. The song also went top 20 in the Netherlands and Belgium, reaching No. 9 and No. 16, respectively.

The song was used in the German crime series Tatort in the 180th episode "Der Tausch".

References

1986 songs
1986 singles
Number-one singles in Germany
Number-one singles in Switzerland
Number-one singles in Austria
Chris Norman songs
Hansa Records singles
Arista Records singles
Songs written by Dieter Bohlen
Song recordings produced by Dieter Bohlen